The 2007 Honda Grand Prix of St. Petersburg was the second round of the 2007 IndyCar Series season. It took place on April 1, 2007.

Results

Honda Grand Prix of St. Petersburg
Grand Prix of St. Petersburg
Honda Grand Prix Of St. Petersburg
21st century in St. Petersburg, Florida
Honda Grand Prix Of St. Petersburg